SNAFU is an acronym that is widely used to stand for the sarcastic expression Situation normal: all fucked up. It is a well-known example of military acronym slang. It is sometimes bowdlerized to "all fouled up" or similar. It means that the situation is bad, but that this is a normal state of affairs. The acronym is believed to have originated in the United States Marine Corps during World War II.

In modern usage, SNAFU is sometimes used as an interjection. SNAFU also sometimes refers to a bad situation, mistake, or cause of trouble. It is more commonly used in modern vernacular to describe running into an error or problem that is large and unexpected. For example, in 2005, The New York Times published an article titled "Hospital Staff Cutback Blamed for Test Result Snafu".

Origin
SNAFU was first recorded in American Notes and Queries in their September 1941 issue. Time magazine used the term in their June 16, 1942, issue: "Last week U.S. citizens knew that gasoline rationing and rubber requisitioning were snafu." Most reference works, including the Random House Unabridged Dictionary, supply an origin date of 1940–1944, generally attributing it to the U.S. Army. Rick Atkinson ascribes the origin of SNAFU, FUBAR, and a bevy of other terms to cynical GIs ridiculing the Army's penchant for acronyms.

The attribution of SNAFU to the American military is not universally accepted: it has also been attributed to the British, although the Oxford English Dictionary gives its origin and first recorded use as U.S. military slang.

In a wider study of military slang, Elkin noted in 1946 that there "are a few acceptable substitutes such as 'screw up' or 'mess up,' but these do not have the emphasis value of the obscene equivalent." He considered the expression to be "a caricature of Army direction. The soldier resignedly accepts his own less responsible position and expresses his cynicism at the inefficiency of Army authority." He also noted that "the expression […] is coming into general civilian use."

Similar acronyms

SUSFU
SUSFU is an acronym for Situation unchanged: still fucked up, but can also be bowdlerized—just like SNAFU—to Situation unchanged: still fouled up. It is used in a military context and was first recorded in the American Notes and Queries in their September 1941 issue.

See also
 Acronym slang in the military
 List of government and military acronyms

References

Sources

External links

Acronym Finder's SNAFU entry
How the term SNAFU originated
SNAFU Principle
Internet Archive: Private SNAFU - The Home Front (1943) - This is one of 26 Private SNAFU cartoons made by the US Army Signal Corps to educate and boost the morale of the troops.
The SNAFU Special - Official website of the C-47 #43-15073
Episode 101 (MP3 6M) of Command Performance from 15 Jan 1944 includes a song about SNAFU by the Spike Jones band. 

Acronyms
Military slang and jargon